The Stamp-Collector's Review and Monthly Advertiser (originally the Monthly Advertiser then The Stamp-Collector's Monthly Advertiser) was one of the earliest philatelic magazines. It was published by Edward Moore & Co. of Liverpool from 15 December 1862 (Vol. 1, No. 1) to 15 June 1864 (Vol. 2, No. 19). Edward Loines Pemberton was the editor from January 1864.

See also
The Philatelic Record
The Stamp-Collector's Magazine

References

External links
Complete digitised archive of The Stamp-Collector's Review and Monthly Advertiser at Smithsonian Libraries

1863 establishments in the United Kingdom
Philatelic periodicals
1864 disestablishments in the United Kingdom
Magazines established in 1863
Magazines disestablished in 1864
English-language magazines
Defunct magazines published in the United Kingdom
Mass media in Liverpool
Monthly magazines published in the United Kingdom
Hobby magazines published in the United Kingdom